Joseph P. Merlino (July 12, 1922 – October 7, 1998) was an American Democratic Party politician who served as President of the New Jersey Senate from 1978 to 1981.

Early life and career
Merlino was born in 1922 in Trenton, New Jersey, the son of Pasquale and Margarita (Fuccello) Merlino. He attended Trenton High School and then served in the U.S. Army, mainly in the Mediterranean area. He received a bachelor's degree from Seton Hall College in 1948 and a law degree from Fordham University in 1951.

From 1956 until 1989, he was the senior partner in the Trenton law firm of Merlino, Rottkamp & Flacks and its predecessors. He served as assistant prosecutor for Mercer County for seven years and as Trenton city attorney from 1966 to 1970.

Legislative career
In 1967, Merlino was elected to the New Jersey General Assembly and was re-elected in 1969, both times from District 6B alongside S. Howard Woodson. He was then elected to the New Jersey Senate from District 6B in 1971 and re-elected in 1973 and 1977 from the 13th district. He was assistant Senate majority leader from 1974 to 1975; majority leader from 1976 to 1977; and president of the Senate from 1978 to 1981.

As Majority Leader and Senate President, Merlino pushed through many legislative programs favored by Governor Brendan Byrne, a longtime political ally. Among this legislation was the state's graduated income tax (passed in 1976) and the Pinelands Protection Act (enacted in 1979, authorizing the New Jersey Pinelands National Reserve).

1981 gubernatorial campaign
In 1981, Merlino ran in the Democratic primary for Governor of New Jersey. The crowded field of 13 Democratic candidates included U.S. Representative James Florio, Newark Mayor Kenneth A. Gibson, U.S. Representative Robert A. Roe, Attorney General John J. Degnan, and Jersey City Mayor Thomas F. X. Smith. Merlino finished in fourth place with 11 percent of the vote behind Florio (26 percent), Roe (16 percent), and Gibson (16 percent).

1982 congressional campaign
In 1982, Merlino ran for the House of Representatives in the newly redistricted 4th Congressional District. Merlino was expected to coast to victory over the 29-year-old freshman Republican  incumbent, Chris Smith, whose 1980 win over Frank Thompson (indicted in the Abscam operation) was seen as a fluke.  At the end of one of their debates, Smith approached Merlino to exchange pleasantries. Merlino was quoted as saying "Beat it, kid." Smith won the election with 53% of the vote.

In 1998, Merlino died at the Forrestal Nursing and Rehabilitation Center in Princeton at the age of 76.

References

External links
Joseph P. Merlino  at The Political Graveyard

|-

|-

|-

1922 births
1998 deaths
Politicians from Trenton, New Jersey
Trenton Central High School alumni
Seton Hall University alumni
Fordham University School of Law alumni
New Jersey lawyers
Democratic Party New Jersey state senators
Presidents of the New Jersey Senate
20th-century American lawyers
20th-century American politicians
American people of Italian descent